Saint Ambrose of Optina (birth name: Aleksander Mikhaylovich Grenkov, December 5, 1812, Bolshaya Lipovitsa settlement, Tambov guberniya – October 23, 1891) was a starets and a hieroschemamonk in Optina Monastery, canonized in the 1988 convention of the Local Council of the Russian Orthodox Church.

Biography
Aleksandr was born in the family of sexton Mikhail Fyodorovich Grenkov and Marfa Nikolayevna Grenkova. He was the sixth of eight children. At the age of 12 Aleksandr entered the Tambov clerical school and later the Tambov theological seminary. In 1835, shortly before the graduation, Aleksandr became severely ill and made a vow if he got well to become a monk. He recovered but delayed his decision and became a private teacher in a family of a landlord and later in the Lipetsk clerical school. During summer vacation, Aleksandr met a well-known elder Hilarion from the village of Troekurovo. The Elder advised: "Go to Optina and you will be experienced. You could go to Sarov too, but there are no more experienced elders there" (at that time, St. Seraphim of Sarov already reposed). And the Elder added: "They need you there". After this advice, in 1839, Aleksandr entered the Optina Monastery in Kaluga guberniya when the monastery was in its spiritual heyday. His first guide was Starets (Elder) Leonid and then later Starets Makary, whom Ambrose shared a cell with. This gave him get help in his spiritual progress.

Ambrose had a very lively humor and sociable character which conflicted with his more stoic spiritual discipline. Ambrose had many struggles with illness throughout his life building upon these struggles for insight into the human condition. Ambrose was tonsured as a monk, after only three years, in 1842. He was given the religious name Ambrose in honour of Saint Ambrose of Milan. In another three years Ambrose advanced and was ordained a hieromonk (priest). On the trip to Kaluga for ordination, Ambrose caught cold. Since then, his health became so poor that he almost could not serve as a priest.

Due to illness Ambrose was forced into semi-reclusion for several years. This seclusion allowed him to concentrate on the mastering of the Jesus Prayer or hesychasm and to experience the meaning of hesychia, the silence of the soul before God or theoria. Even though of a weak constitution Father Ambrose continued work assisting Elder Makary with the translation of the Holy Fathers, in particular, with the translation of The Ladder of Divine Ascent. Father Ambrose maintained his correspondence and counsel to pilgrims, and later as a staretz (Elder) out of love for all people he counseled and any who sought him.

When Elder Macarius died in September, 1860, Father Ambrose replaced him as the principal elder of the monastery. Elder Ambrose remained the principal staretz of Optina for 30 years. Ambrose was visited by countless people, and his love for every person was so strong that he would even see people when he had passed the point of exhaustion being forced to lay down. Even then he would not refuse to listen to people coming to him to seek his counsel. The staretz had the gift of being able to see into people's souls where no secret was hidden from him. There is abundant testimony to his clairvoyance and gift of healing which he tried to conceal. Known for his deep kindness and compassion, no one's question or counsel was refused.

Being able to give wise advice to other people, Elder Ambrose, due to his humility, sought advice from others without relying on his own mind even having the gift of reasoning. After the death of Elder Macarius, having no one to turn to in his monastery, he turned first to his bishop Gregory. And over time, learning from some credible people about one hidden, wandering spiritual elder, elder Ambrose immediately tried to get close to him. He constantly wrote secret letters to this elder with the intention to do everything with the advice of another person in which he saw the expression of the will of God – not following own will.

Saint Ambrose founded Shamordino Convent in 1884. This convent, which is near Optina, opened its doors to women who were poor, sickly, or even blind. Most convents were very poor and had to rely on the incomes of women who had a certain personal wealth in order to remain open. Saint Ambrose made it possible for any woman who wished to become a nun. After the death of the first abbess, Mother Sophia, Father Ambrose went there in June 1890 to put the convent's affairs in order. He was unable to return to Optina due to illness, and died in the Shamordino cloister on October 10, 1891, and was buried in the Optina "desert" (poustin). His relics were placed in the Vvedensky Church of the Monastery.

Cultural allusions

Dostoevsky stated that in Elder Ambrose he had found a living example of the Christian ideal. Elder Nektary of The Brothers Karamazov referred to Ambrose as "an earthly angel and a heavenly man." Saint Ambrose is supposed to have been seen surrounded by the uncreated light more than once. In the Russian Orthodox tradition, this is the definitive sign of transfiguration and citizenship in the Kingdom of Heaven to come, or paradise, similar to what has been attributed to Saint Seraphim of Sarov.

Ambrose was also a subject in Velikoe v malom i Antikhrist by Serge Nilus.

Quotes
"One should live without hypocrisy and behave in such a way as to set an example, then our actions will be right, otherwise they will turn out bad" (Russian: «Нужно жить нелицемерно и вести себя примерно, тогда дело наше будет верно, а иначе выйдет скверно»)
"Live without cares, judge no-one, vex no-one, and honour everyone" («Жить - не тужить, никого не осуждать, никому не досаждать, и всем мое почтение»)
"From kindness, people see things entirely differently."
"Do not be greatly disturbed by the arrangement of your fate. Have only the unwavering desire for salvation and, standing before God, await His help until the time comes."

Works
Answer to those who are favorable to the Latin Church. Ответ благосклонным к Латинской Церкви (in Russian)
Fear of God / Страх Божий. (in Russian)
Отечник. Христианский брак

See also

Seraphim of Sarov
Optina Monastery
Kazan St Ambrose Convent
Lev of Optina

References

External links
Venerable Ambrose of Optina Orthodox icon and synaxarion
Optina martyrs: the three monks murdered in 1993
Optina elders
Life of the blessed Starets Ambrose of Optina
Views of the monastery 

Russian saints of the Eastern Orthodox Church
Miracle workers
Russian Orthodox monks
Russian Eastern Orthodox priests
19th-century Eastern Orthodox priests
19th-century Christian saints
Starets
Hesychasts
1812 births
1891 deaths
19th-century Christian monks
Monks from the Russian Empire
Optina Elders